The 2003 Gloucester City Council election took place on 1 May 2003 to elect members of Gloucester City Council in England. The council remained under no overall control. The leader of the council, Kevin Stephens of Labour, lost his seat. The leader of the Liberal Democrats group, Bill Crowther, became leader of the council after the election.

Results  

|}

Ward results

Abbey

Barnwood

Barton and Tredworth

Hucclecote

Kingsholm and Wotton

Longlevens

Matson and Robinswood

Moreland

Quedgeley Fieldcourt

Quedgeley Severn Vale

Westgate

References

2003 English local elections
2003
2000s in Gloucestershire